Axiopoeniella octocentra is a species of moth in the subfamily Arctiinae first described by Vári in 1964. It is found in South Africa.

References

Endemic moths of South Africa
Moths described in 1964
Arctiinae
Moths of Africa